Christoph Carl Herbert "Chris" Adami (born August 30, 1962) is a professor of Microbiology and Molecular Genetics, as well as professor of Physics and Astronomy, at Michigan State University.

Education
Adami was born in Brussels, Belgium, and graduated from the European School of Brussels I. He obtained a Diplom in physics from the University of Bonn and an MA and a Ph.D. in theoretical nuclear physics from Stony Brook University in 1991. Adami was a Division Prize Fellow in the lab of Steven E. Koonin at the California Institute of Technology from 1992-1995, and was subsequently on the Caltech faculty as a senior research associate.

Career
Before joining Michigan State University, he was a professor of Applied Life Sciences at the Keck Graduate Institute in Claremont, California. Adami is best known for his work on Avida, an artificial life simulator used to study evolutionary biology, and for applying the theory of information to physical and biological systems.  Together with Nicolas J. Cerf, Adami made significant advances in the quantum theory of information in the late 1990s.

Honors
He received the NASA Exceptional Achievement Medal while serving at JPL, and was elected a Fellow of the AAAS in 2012. He was also elected a Fellow of the American Physical Society in 2017. On July 31, 2019, He was awarded the Lifetime Achievement Award by The International Society for Artificial Life.

Works

References

External links
Adami's website at Michigan State University
Adami's public site at Michigan State University
List of publications at Google Scholar
Adami's Blog "Spherical Harmonics"
Adami's [HuffPost] Blog
The Evolutionary Origin of Complex Adaptive Features 2003 Nature Paper

TEDx Talk (2011)

1962 births
Living people
21st-century American physicists
Researchers of artificial life
Stony Brook University alumni
Michigan State University faculty
Fellows of the American Association for the Advancement of Science
Complex systems scientists
German emigrants to the United States
Alumni of the European Schools
Fellows of the American Physical Society